The 2020 Tour de l'Ain was a men's road bicycle race that took place from 7 to 9 August 2020 in the Ain department in France. The winner was Primož Roglič. It was the 32nd edition of the Tour de l'Ain. The race is rated as a 2.1 event and forms part of the 2020 UCI Europe Tour.

Teams
Twenty teams participate in the race. The teams that participate are:

UCI WorldTeams

 
 
 
 
 
 
 
 
 
 
 
 

UCI Professional Continental Teams

 
 
 
 
 
 

UCI Continental Teams

 
 
 
 

National Teams

 Germany U-23
 Switzerland

Route

Stages

Stage 1
7 August 2020 – Montréal-la-Cluse to Ceyzériat,

Stage 2
8 August 2020 – Lagnieu to Lélex Monts-Jura,

Stage 3
9 August 2020 – Saint-Vulbas to Grand Colombier,

Classification leadership

Classification standings

General classification

Points classification

Mountains classification

Young rider classification

Teams classification

References

2020 UCI Europe Tour
2020 in French sport
August 2020 sports events in France